Nemaha County (standard abbreviation: NM) is a county located in the northeastern part of the U.S. state of Kansas.  As of the 2020 census, the county population was 10,273. The county seat is Seneca.

History

Early history

For many millennia the Great Plains of North America was inhabited by nomadic Native Americans.  From the 16th century to 18th century, the Kingdom of France claimed ownership of large parts of North America.  In 1762, after the French and Indian War, France secretly ceded New France to Spain, per the Treaty of Fontainebleau.

19th century
In 1802, Spain returned most of the land to France, but keeping title to about 7,500 square miles.  In 1803, most of the land for modern day Kansas was acquired by the United States from France as part of the 828,000 square mile Louisiana Purchase for 2.83 cents per acre.

In 1854, the Kansas Territory was organized, then in 1861 Kansas became the 34th U.S. state.  In 1855, Nemaha County was established.

The first railroad in Nemaha County was built in 1866.

On May 30, 1879, the "Irving, Kansas Tornado" passed through Nemaha county. Eighteen people were killed and sixty were injured in this tornado.

Geography

Adjacent counties
 Richardson County, Nebraska (northeast)
 Brown County (east)
 Jackson County (southeast)
 Pottawatomie County (southwest)
 Marshall County (west)
 Pawnee County, Nebraska (northwest)

Demographics

As of the census of 2000, there were 10,717 people, 3,959 households, and 2,763 families residing in the county.  The population density was 15 people per square mile (6/km2).  There were 4,340 housing units at an average density of 6 per square mile (2/km2).  The racial makeup of the county was 98.35% White, 0.49% Black or African American, 0.23% Native American, 0.10% Asian, 0.06% Pacific Islander, 0.17% from other races, and 0.60% from two or more races.  0.71% of the population were Hispanic or Latino of any race.

There were 3,959 households, out of which 34.00% had children under the age of 18 living with them, 61.90% were married couples living together, 5.10% had a female householder with no husband present, and 30.20% were non-families. 28.00% of all households were made up of individuals, and 16.00% had someone living alone who was 65 years of age or older.  The average household size was 2.58 and the average family size was 3.20.

In the county, the population was spread out, with 28.50% under the age of 18, 6.00% from 18 to 24, 24.10% from 25 to 44, 19.40% from 45 to 64, and 22.00% who were 65 years of age or older.  The median age was 39 years. For every 100 females there were 97.00 males.  For every 100 females age 18 and over, there were 95.10 males.

The median income for a household in the county was $34,296, and the median income for a family was $41,838. Males had a median income of $28,879 versus $19,340 for females. The per capita income for the county was $17,121.  About 6.50% of families and 9.10% of the population were below the poverty line, including 9.90% of those under age 18 and 8.50% of those age 65 or over.

Government

Presidential elections
Nemaha County is strongly Republican. Lyndon Johnson is the only Democrat to have carried the county since 1936.

Laws
Nemaha County was a prohibition, or "dry", county until the Kansas Constitution was amended in 1986 and voters approved the sale of alcoholic liquor by the individual drink with a 30% food sales requirement.

Education

Unified school districts
 Prairie Hills USD 113
 Nemaha Central USD 115

Communities

Cities

 Bern
 Centralia
 Corning
 Goff
 Oneida
 Sabetha (partly in Brown County)
 Seneca
 Wetmore

Census-designated place
 Baileyville

Other unincorporated communities

 Berwick
 Capioma
 Kelly
 Neuchatel
 St. Benedict
 Woodlawn

Townships
Nemaha County is divided into twenty townships.  The cities of Sabetha and Seneca are considered governmentally independent and are excluded from the census figures for the townships.  In the following table, the population center is the largest city (or cities) included in that township's population total, if it is of a significant size.

See also
 National Register of Historic Places listings in Nemaha County, Kansas

References

Notes

Further reading

 Atlas of Nemaha County, Kansas; Anderson Publishing Co; 62 pages; 1922.
 Plat Book of Nemaha County, Kansas; A.R. Stinson; 53 pages; 1908.

External links

County
 
 Nemaha County – Directory of Public Officials
Other information
 The Irving Tornado
 Historical Tornadoes
Maps
 Nemaha County maps: Current, Historic, KDOT
 Kansas Highway maps: Current, Historic, KDOT
 Kansas Railroad maps: Current, 1996, 1915, KDOT and Kansas Historical Society

 
Kansas placenames of Native American origin
Kansas counties
1855 establishments in Kansas Territory